Ignacio "Nacho" Elvira Mijares (born 17 February 1987) is a Spanish professional golfer who plays on the European Tour.

Amateur career
Elvira played college golf at Texas A&M University where he won one event and was a two-time All-American.

Professional career
Elvira played on the Challenge Tour in 2012 and 2013, finishing 104th and then 14th.  He won his first title in 2013 at The Foshan Open in China, and finished 14th in the Order of Merit to gain a place on the 2014 European Tour.

After a mediocre 2014 European Tour season in which he finished 121st, he returned to the Challenge Tour for 2015, where he won three times to earn an immediate return to the European Tour.

Since 2016 he has played on the European Tour. He lost a playoff at the 2016 Trophée Hassan II to Wang Jeung-hun. In 2019, he lost in another sudden death playoff to Scott Hend at the Maybank Championship. He had held the 54-hole lead but went to the last hole of regulation play, one stroke behind Hend. During his approach to the 18th, a clap of thunder occurred during his backswing, resulting in him leaving a 30 foot putt for birdie. Play was then suspended for over an hour, but Elvira came back to sink the lengthy birdie putt to force a playoff. He lost on the first extra hole, when Hend made an up and down from the bunker for birdie.

In July 2021, Elvira beat Justin Harding in a playoff to win the Cazoo Open for his first European Tour victory.

He moved to a career best 126th in the Official World Golf Ranking in February 2017.

Amateur wins
2008 Barona Intercollegiate Cup

Professional wins (5)

European Tour wins (1)

European Tour playoff record (1–2)

Challenge Tour wins (4)

Team appearances
Amateur
European Youths' Team Championship (representing Spain): 2006 (winners)
European Amateur Team Championship (representing Spain): 2007, 2009, 2010, 2011
Eisenhower Trophy (representing Spain): 2010
Palmer Cup (representing Europe): 2011
Source:

See also
2013 Challenge Tour graduates
2015 Challenge Tour graduates
List of golfers to achieve a three-win promotion from the Challenge Tour
List of golfers with most Challenge Tour wins

References

External links

Spanish male golfers
European Tour golfers
Texas A&M Aggies men's golfers
Golfers from Madrid
1987 births
Living people
20th-century Spanish people
21st-century Spanish people